Doron Jamchi, also spelled Jamchy (born July 1, 1961), is an Israeli former professional basketball player. He was the top scorer in the 1998-99 Israel Basketball League. Widely considered one of the best shooters in the history of European basketball, Jamchi is the all-time leading scorer in the history of the Israeli Premier League, having scored 9,611 points in 466 games. He is also the most capped player of Israel's senior national team, with 191 caps, and the all-time leading scorer in the history of the Israeli national basketball team, with 3,515 points.

Career
Jamchi played for Maccabi Tel Aviv (1985–1996 and 1999–2000), and Maccabi Rishon Le Zion (1996–1999). He won 11 Israeli League championships (1986, 1987, 1988, 1989, 1990, 1991, 1992, 1994, 1995, 1996, 2000), and 7 Israeli State Cups (1986, 1987, 1989, 1990, 1991, 1994, 2000). He was the top scorer in the 1998-99 Israel Basketball League.

While playing for Maccabi, he was also a 2 time FIBA European Champions Cup (EuroLeague) semifinalist (1986, 1991), and a 4 time FIBA European Champions Cup (EuroLeague) Finalist (1987, 1988, 1989, and 2000). Jamchi was also a four time member of the FIBA European Selections (1987, 1990, 1991, 1995).

National team
Jamchi played seven times for the senior men's Israeli national basketball team at the EuroBasket, as well as at the 1986 FIBA World Championship. At EuroBasket 1985, Jamchi was the top scorer, with an average of 25.8 points per game, ahead of Dražen Petrović (25.1) and Detlef Schrempf (22.3).

Personal life
Jamchi is Jewish.

See also
List of select Jewish basketball players

References

External links 
FIBA Profile
FIBA Europe Profile

1961 births
Living people
Israeli Jews
Israeli men's basketball players
Jewish men's basketball players
Maccabi Tel Aviv B.C. players
Shooting guards
Small forwards
Survivor (Israeli TV series) contestants
1986 FIBA World Championship players
People from Petah Tikva